Tanganyika Strut  is the last of the three 1958 Savoy recordings made by jazz musicians John Coltrane and Wilbur Harden. The album features the two men as leaders, and is Harden's final as a leader. The sessions also produced a couple of alternate takes which can be found on some compilations, most notably the ones featuring the complete Savoy recordings made by Harden and Coltrane together, The Complete Mainstream 1958 Sessions (2009) and The Complete Savoy Sessions (1999).

Track listing
 "Tanganyika Strut" (Curtis Fuller)  – 9:57
 "B.J." (Wilbur Harden)  – 4:32
 "Anedac" (Wilbur Harden)  – 5:12
 "Once in a While" (Michael Edwards (m) - Bud Green (w))  – 9:28

Recorded on June 24 (#1) and May 13 (all others), 1958.

Personnel
 John Coltrane – tenor saxophone
 Wilbur Harden – trumpet, flugelhorn
 Curtis Fuller – trombone
 Tommy Flanagan – piano (#1)
 Howard Williams – piano (#2–4)
 Ali Jackson – bass
 Art Taylor – drums

References

1958 albums
John Coltrane albums
Savoy Records albums
Wilbur Harden albums
Albums produced by Ozzie Cadena